An icebox (also called a cold closet) is a compact non-mechanical refrigerator which was a common early-twentieth-century kitchen appliance before the development of safely powered refrigeration devices. Before the development of electric refrigerators, iceboxes were referred to by the public as "refrigerators". Only after the invention of the modern electric refrigerator did early non-electric refrigerators become known as iceboxes. The terms ice box and refrigerator were used interchangeably in advertising as long ago as 1848.

Origin 

The first recorded use of refrigeration technology dates back to 1775 BC in the Sumerian city of Terqa. It was there that the region's King, Zimri-lim, began the construction of an elaborate ice house fitted with a sophisticated drainage system and shallow pools to freeze water in the night. Using ice for cooling and preservation was nothing new by then, but these ice houses paved the way for their smaller counterpart, the icebox, to come into existence. The traditional kitchen icebox dates back to the days of ice harvesting, whose heyday ran from the mid-19th century until the 1930s, when the electric refrigerator was introduced for home use. Most municipally consumed ice was harvested in winter from snow-packed areas or frozen lakes, stored in ice houses, and delivered domestically. In 1827 the commercial ice cutter was invented, increasing the ease and efficiency of harvesting natural ice. This invention made ice cheaper and in turn helped the icebox become more common.

Up until then, iceboxes for domestic use were not mass  manufactured. By the 1840s, however, various companies including the Baldwin Refrigerator Company and the Ranney Refrigerator Company, and later Sears, started making home iceboxes commercially. D. Eddy & Son of Boston is considered to be the first company to produce iceboxes in mass numbers. As many Americans desired big iceboxes, some companies, such as the Boston Scientific Refrigerator Company, introduced ones which could hold up to 50 lbs. of ice. In a 1907 survey of expenditures of New York City inhabitants, 81% of the families surveyed were found to possess "refrigerators" either in the form of ice stored in a tub or iceboxes. The industry's value in the United States rose from $4.5 million in 1889 to $26 million in 1919.

Design 

The icebox was invented by an American farmer and cabinetmaker named Thomas Moore in 1802.  Moore used the icebox to transport butter from his home to the Georgetown markets, which allowed him to sell firm, brick butter instead of soft, melted tubs like his fellow vendors at the time. His first design consisted of an oval cedar tub with a tin container fitted inside with ice between them, all wrapped in rabbit fur to insulate the device. Later versions would include hollow walls that were lined with tin or zinc and packed with various insulating materials such as cork, sawdust, straw or seaweed. A large block of ice is held in a tray or compartment near the top of the box. Cold air circulates down and around storage compartments in the lower section. Some finer models have spigots for draining ice water from a catch pan or holding tank. In cheaper models, a drip pan is placed under the box and has to be emptied at least daily. The user has to replenish the melted ice, normally by obtaining new ice from an iceman. The design of the icebox allowed perishable foods to be stored longer than before and without the need for lengthier preservation processes such as smoking, drying, or canning. Refrigerating perishables also had the added benefit of not altering the taste of what it is preserving.

Ice collection and distribution 

Underground pits with the constant underground temperature of  had been used since Roman times to help preserve ice collected during winter. Prior to the convenience of having refrigeration inside the home, cold storage systems would often be located underground in the form of a pit. These pits would be deep enough to provide thorough insulation and also to deter animals from intruding on the perishable items within. Early examples used straw and sawdust compacted along the sides of ice to provide further insulation and to slow the ice melting process.

By 1781, personal ice pits were becoming more advanced. The Robert Morris Ice House, located in Philadelphia, brought new refrigeration technologies to the forefront. This pit contained a drainage system for water runoff as well as the use of brick and mortar for its insulation. The octagon-shaped pit, approximately 4 meters in diameter located 5.5 meters underground was capable of storing ice that was obtained during the winter months to the next October or November. Ice blocks collected during winter months could later be distributed to customers. As the icebox began to make its way into homes during the early to mid 19th century, ice collection and distribution expanded and soon became a global industry. During the latter half of the 19th century, natural ice became the second most important US export by value, after cotton.

Impact and legacy 
As the techniques for food preservation steadily improved, prices decreased and food became more readily available. As more households adopted the icebox, the overall quality and freshness of this food was also improved. Iceboxes meant that people were able to go to the market less and could more safely store leftovers. All of this contributed to the improvement of the population's health by increasing the fresh food readily able to be consumed and the overall safety of that food. However, with metropolitan growth, many sources of natural ice became contaminated from industrial pollution or sewer runoff. Thanks to the icebox manufacturing industry's efforts, a new innovative idea in cooling came about: air circulation. The idea for air circulation in refrigeration systems stems back to John Schooley, who wrote about his process in the 1856 Scientific American, a popular science magazine. Schooley described the process as "Combining an ice receptacle with the interior of a refrigerator … a continuous circulation of air shall be kept up through the ice in said receptacle and through the interior of the refrigerator … so that the circulation air shall deposit its moisture on the ice every time it passes through it, and be dried and cooled." This idea of air circulation and cold led to the eventual invention of the mechanical, gas-driven refrigerators. As these early mechanical refrigerators became available, they were installed at large industrial plants producing ice for home delivery.

By the early 1930s, mechanical ice machines gradually began to rise over the ice harvesting industry thanks to its ability to produce clean, sanitary ice independently and year-round. Over time, as the mechanical ice machines became smaller, cheaper, and more efficient, they easily replaced the hassle of getting ice from a source. For example, the De La Vergne Refrigerating Machine Company of New York, New York could produce up to 220 tons of ice in a single day from a single machine. With widespread electrification and safer refrigerants, mechanical refrigeration in the home became possible. With the development of the chlorofluorocarbons (along with the succeeding hydrochlorofluorocarbons and hydrofluorocarbons), that came to replace the use of toxic ammonia gas, the refrigerator replaced the icebox, though icebox is still sometimes used to refer to mechanical refrigerators.

See also 
 Travel cooler
 Coolgardie safe
 Meat safe
 Pot-in-pot refrigerator
 California cooler (cabinet)

References

Further reading

External links

 
  "What's an Ice Box?" Historical Highlights from the DeForest Area Historical Society, DeForest, Wisconsin

Home appliances
Food preservation
Cooling technology
Food storage
Water ice
Refrigerators